Robert Berman, known as Bob Berman, is an American astronomer, author, and science popularizer.
He runs Overlook Observatory in Woodstock, New York, USA. He was an adjunct professor of astronomy at New York’s Marymount College located in Westchester County, from 1996 to 2000 and has appeared on CBS This Morning, the Today Show, and the Late Show with David Letterman.

Biography
In 1976, Berman founded the Catskill Astronomical Society.
From 1986 to 1994 he ran the summer astronomy program at Yellowstone National Park. He was the "Sky Lights" and "Night Watchman" astronomy columnist for Discover from 1989 to 2006. He is currently Astronomy Magazine'''s "Strange Universe" columnist and contributing editor.

He also is the astronomy editor of The Old Farmer's Almanac. He has led aurora and eclipse expeditions as far away as the Arctic and Antarctic.

Berman conducts a weekly radio broadcast, "Skywindow", and a monthly, hour-long call-in show on Northeast Public Radio. He was keynote speaker at Starfest 2007.
He is also heard nightly on Slooh.com

 Bibliography 

 
 
 
 
 
 
 
 
 
 Lanza, Robert and Berman, Bob (2009), Biocentrism: How Life and Consciousness are the Keys to Understanding the True Nature of the Universe, BenBella; .
 Berman, Bob (2011), The Sun's Heartbeat: And Other Stories From the Life of the Star That Powers Our Planet; Little Brown, 
 Berman, Bob (2014), ZOOM: How Everything Moves, From Atoms and Galaxies to Blizzards and Bees, Little Brown, 
 Lanza, Robert and Berman, Bob (2016), Beyond Biocentrism: Rethinking Time, Space, Consciousness, and the Illusion of Death'', 
 Zapped: From Infrared to Xrays, the Curious History of Invisible Light  (2017) Little Brown 
 Earth-Shattering:  Violent Supernovas, Galactic Explosions, Biological Mayhem, Nuclear Meltdowns, and other hazards to Life in our Universe (2019) Little Brown, and Company
 The Grand Biocentric Design: How Life Creates Reality  by Robert Lanza, Matej Pavsic, Bob Berman (2020, Benbella Books)

References

External links
Bob Berman's website
"Spring Sky Show", NPR

Living people
American science writers
20th-century  American  astronomers
Astronomy education
Year of birth missing (living people)
American nature writers
American male non-fiction writers
Discover (magazine) people